James William Garrett Jr. (June 19, 1930 – February 9, 2018) was an American football player, coach, and scout. He played college football at Utah State University. He served as football head football coach at Susquehanna University from 1960 to 1965 and Columbia University in 1985, compiling a career college football coaching record of 39–21–1.

Early years
Garrett attended Rutherford High School, where he played as a halfback and linebacker. He was an All-county and All-state selection in 1946 and 1947. He also received All-state honors in baseball as a senior.

He accepted a football scholarship from Saint Mary's College of California. He transferred after his sophomore season to Utah State University and had to sit out for one year. He was an All-Skyline Conference fullback as a junior in 1950. He also led the baseball team in batting with a .429 average as a senior, while playing catcher.

After graduating in 1951, he went into the United States Army and served for two years at Fort Lee, where he was twice named All-Army and set a rushing record for the Fort in 1953.

Playing career
On January 25, 1954, he signed a contract with the Philadelphia Eagles. He played in 5 exhibition games, but suffered a knee injury and was waived on September 7. He signed a baseball contract with the Pittsburgh Pirates organization and attended their spring training following his NFL rookie season.

On March 3, 1955, he signed with the BC Lions of the Canadian Football League, where he was a starter. He played in seven games, registering 5 carries for 33 yards. 

In July 1956, he signed with the New York Giants, but broke his leg in six places during spring drills and was placed on the injured reserve list. On June 21, 1957, he signed with the Ottawa Roughriders of the Canadian Football League. He was released on August 14.

Coaching career
Garrett began his coaching career in the United States Army, serving as Athletic Director at Quartermaster Center and School at Fort Lee, from 1952 until his discharge in May 1954. He was named the football head coach at Pawling High School on September 8, 1955. In 1957, he began coaching football at the United States Coast Guard Academy, where he also was an assistant Director of Athletics, while helping with the basketball and baseball coaching. 

In June 1959, he was hired as an assistant football coach at Lehigh University. In July 1960, he was named the Athletic director and head football coach at Susquehanna University. He also coached the baseball team from 1962 to 1965 and guided the track and field team in 1961. He led the football team to a 39–11–1 record, which included undefeated seasons in 1961 and 1962. He was fired during the seventh game of the 1965 season for assaulting a player. Gustave Weber replaced Garrett as head coach and led Susquehanna to two losses, both against non-conference opponents, the team finished the season 0–9 overall. In 1968, he assumed the head coach position for the Orlando Panthers of the Continental Football League.

He spent most of the next 40 years in the National Football League as an assistant coach with the New York Giants (1970–1973), the New Orleans Saints (1976–1977), and the Cleveland Browns (1978–1984). He was named vice president and head coach of the Houston Texans of the fledgling World Football League, from April 1974 until the team's collapse and location move during the month of October. 

On May 14, 1975, he was named the football head coach at Millburn High School in New Jersey, where he had a brief stint.  On December 27, 1984, he was named the head coach at Columbia University, taking over a program that had won only five of its last 63 contests and had one winning season since 1963. His time in the school was fraught with controversy, and was forced to resign as the team went 0–10, among accusations of verbal and physical abuse. After the season, his sons John, Jason and Judd, who were enrolled at Columbia, transferred to Princeton University.

Scouting career
Garrett served from 1966 to 1967 as a talent scout for the Blesto 9 scouting service. He scouted for the Dallas Cowboys during three periods of time: 1968-1969, 1974-1975 and 1987-2003. As a college scout for the Cowboys, he wrote the original scouting report on quarterback Troy Aikman and famously pushed for the team to draft wide receiver Randy Moss. In 1986, he scouted for the Buffalo Bills.

Personal life
Garrett and his wife Jane (née Lentz) were the parents of eight children. His sons John, Jason and Judd coached in the NFL. Jason previously played and coached for the Dallas Cowboys, John is the head coach at Lafayette College, Judd is a front office executive with the Cowboys, and Jim III teaches high school English at University School.

Garrett owned a beach house in New Jersey where he set up a makeshift practice field in his backyard, which he would use as an opportunity to teach the sport to his family members and other players in the nearby area. There have been reports in the media that there would be upwards of 20 people at a given time being mentored by him. Some of these individuals included NFL players Sam Mills, Miles Austin, Harry Flaherty Sr., Dino Hall, Bill Hill, Ethan Brooks and Darian Barnes.

Garrett ran 2.5 miles every single day for 25 years without missing a day, until suffering a serious stroke in September 2012. He died at the age of 87 on February 9, 2018.

Legacy
Garrett was inducted into the Susquehanna University Sports Hall of Fame in 1981. He was part of the inaugural class inducted into the Rutherford High School's Athletic Hall of Fame in 1996. In 2001, Susquehanna University named their athletic complex building in his honor as the James W. Garrett Sports Complex. In 2018, he was inducted posthumously into the Middle Atlantic Conference Sports Hall of Fame.

Head coaching record

References

External links
 Celebrating The Incredible Life Of Former Cowboys Scout Jim Garrett
 Longtime Cowboys Scout & Former Coach Jim Garrett Passes Away

1930 births
2018 deaths
BC Lions players
Buffalo Bills scouts
Cleveland Browns coaches
Coast Guard Bears football coaches
Columbia Lions football coaches
Continental Football League coaches
Dallas Cowboys scouts
High school football coaches in New Jersey
Houston Texans (WFL) coaches
Lehigh Mountain Hawks football coaches
New Orleans Saints coaches
New York Giants coaches
New York Giants players
People from Rutherford, New Jersey
Players of American football from New Jersey
Rutherford High School (New Jersey) alumni
Saint Mary's Gaels football players
Sportspeople from Bergen County, New Jersey
Susquehanna River Hawks athletic directors
Susquehanna River Hawks baseball coaches
Susquehanna River Hawks football coaches
Utah State Aggies baseball players
Utah State Aggies football players
Garett family